Horst Fink (born 1 October 1938) is an Austrian rower. He competed in the men's single sculls event at the 1960 Summer Olympics.

References

1938 births
Living people
Austrian male rowers
Olympic rowers of Austria
Rowers at the 1960 Summer Olympics
Rowers from Linz